Aljaž Radinski (born 8 June 1995) is a Slovenian tennis player.

Career
Radinski has a career high ATP singles ranking of 802 achieved on 11 July 2016 and a career high ATP doubles ranking of 974, achieved on 8 August 2016.

Radinski has represented Slovenia at the Davis Cup, where he has a win-loss record of 1–1.

Future and Challenger finals

Doubles 1 (0 titles, 1 runners-up)

External links
 
 
 

1995 births
Living people
Slovenian male tennis players
Sportspeople from Maribor